Cerro Azul ("Blue Hill") is a fishing village and formerly a commercial port in the Cañete Province, Lima Region, Peru. Located 131 km south of Lima, it is frequently visited in the summer by its residents, and those of San Vicente de Cañete. The village has come to depend more heavily on tourism than on fishing. It was quite considerably damaged in the 2007 earthquake that shook much of the southern coast of Peru.

The beach forms an attractive bay that ends in a rocky point where the waves it is famous for break. These break from left to right, are well shaped and go for about half a mile on a good day.  The renowned quality of its waves is mentioned in the Beach Boys' song "Surfin' Safari". However, the quality of the waves changes seasonally and from year to year, as the sand and stones that make up the beach are chronically withdrawn by the sea to form a bank where the waves break.

South of the pier is the area known as Puerto Viejo ("old port" ), where all the holiday homes are and where most of the surfing takes place (left breaks). To the north of the pier, the beach is much longer, less curved and much sandier. There are no holiday homes on it and in the winter is empty. During the summer, it is popular with campers and day-trippers. It is possible to surf here too, when the swell is high, particularly adjacent to the pier, where the waves are fast and the rides tend to be short. .

Cerro Azul's main feature is the pier which was built by a British company around 1900 for the export of locally grown cotton. The pier has been disused for over 60 years and is now frequented by fishermen and tourists and is one of the main tourists attractions.

The village also has an attractive main square and the remains of Pre-Inca mud buildings, half buried by sand between two hills which are made from the blue rock that gives the village its name. The other hill features a derelict lighthouse from the days when the area functioned as a port. It sits above craggy, vertical, dangerous cliffs, where birds in the area make their nests. Of note is the Inca tern, a bird endemic to the Humboldt Current, which sweeps the Peruvian coast. Other wildlife of note commonly seen in the area: porpoises, pelicans, sea lions, herons and, on rare occasions, sharks. The village prides itself in catching the largest shark in Peruvian history (in 1989), a 5m long great white. Behind the village, across the Pan-American Highway, are fields and winding valleys in the foothills of the Andes.

History 

In pre-Columbian times, Cerro Azul was the site of a fishing village of the Kingdom of Warku. Warku was contemporaneous with the Chimú culture to the north. The Kingdom of Warku was hierarchical; at Cerro Azul elites lived in large compounds while commoners lived in smaller structures. All residences at Cerro Azul included rooms for drying fish. The dried fish could later be traded for goods from outside the village. Elite residences included a brewery that contained large hearths and gigantic vessels to store the chicha (corn beer) that could be served during feasts.

The town was subdued by the Inca Pachacutec who ordered to build a stone fortress (Fortaleza de Cerro Azul), with steps down to the sea in honor of his victory and a symbol of his absolute power. This fort was as grand and magnificent as the Sacsayhuaman fortress according to Cieza and some historians.

In 1830 it is issued a decree which temporarily enables the Port of Cerro Azul for the coasting trade, i.e. to allow landlocked products in the valley of Cañete, as well as the production of the guano islands nearby.

Images 

Populated places in the Lima Region
Surfing locations in Peru